Skylab VI is the sixth studio album by the Brazilian musician Rogério Skylab, the sixth in his series of ten eponymous, numbered albums. Self-released in 2006, it is so far Skylab's longest album, totaling 19 tracks, and was responsible for spawning one of his most famous compositions, "Dedo, Língua, Cu e Boceta".

During one of the album's recording sessions, Skylab fell down and broke his jaw; a photograph of him in bandages, taken hours after the surgery he had to undergo, was used as the cover art.

A live version of the track "Cu e Boca" previously appeared on Skylab II. "Hino Nacional do Skylab" is sung to the tune of the Brazilian National Anthem. "Eu Não Tenho Eu" opens with a long excerpt of an interview museologist and carnavalesco Clóvis Bornay gave to Skylab in 2005, shortly before his death. "Para de Roncar, Filha da Puta!!!" was dedicated to Skylab's wife, who according to him snores during sleep.

A music video was made for the track "Amo Muito Tudo Isso".

The album can be downloaded for free on Skylab's official website.

Critical reception
Writing for website Pílula Pop, Bráulio Lorentz gave Skylab VI a mixed review, rating it with a 6 out of 10. He stated that the album can be "quite repetitive lyrically with its constant references to the word 'ass'", but praised the tracks "Amo Muito Tudo Isso", "Eu e Você" and "Eu Não Tenho Eu" as "surprising".

Track listing

Personnel
 Rogério Skylab – vocals, production
 Rodrigo Saci – bass guitar
 Alexandre Guichard – classical guitar
 Bruno Coelho – drums
 Thiago Amorim – electric guitar
 Gabriel Muzak – electric guitar
 Clóvis Bornay – vocals (track 17)
 Vânius Marques – mixing
 Luiz Tornaghi – mastering
 Solange Venturi – photography
 Carlos Mancuso – cover art

References

2006 albums
Rogério Skylab albums
Self-released albums
Sequel albums
Obscenity controversies in music
Albums free for download by copyright owner